Superficies is a Latin legal term referring to anything which is placed upon and attached to the ground, and most commonly refers to a building erected on land owned by another.

Roman law 
Under Roman law, ownership of a building was considered inseparable from ownership of the land beneath it. A person with the right to use the land for a superficies, known as a superficarius, enjoyed a right to use the superficies, bequeath it to his heirs and encumber it, despite not "owning" it outright. The right was known as a Jus Superficiarium.

Countries of European Union 
Under the headline of Building Leases, a report on Real Property Law within the European Union describes separate statutory rights in rem called rights of superficie, bail à construction, building leases, or Erbbaurecht, which entitle to full ownership of buildings erected on (including above or below) foreign ground for long periods.

The Netherlands 

The right of superficies is a real property right which enables its proprietor - the superficiary - to have or obtain for himself buildings, constructions or plants in, on or above an immovable thing owned by someone else (Article 5:101 (1) Dutch Civil Code). .. .. A right of superficies may in addition serve to obtain the ownership of pipes, cables and tubes under or above someone else's land.

Romanian law 

A new Civil Code of Romania defines Superficies as follows: the right to have or to erect a building on someone other's land, above or under ground of that land, on which the superficiary acquires a right of use (art. 693).

Japanese law

The right is defined under Article 265 of the Civil Code as the right to use the land of another for the purpose of owning buildings, trees or bamboo. A superficies is not limited to these purposes however. For example, subway companies in Japan obtain a superficies for their right to travel under properties belonging to others.

A superficies may also be created by operation of law when a mortgage is foreclosed.

Unlike a land lease, a superficies is considered to be a property right, can be indefinite in duration, imposes no upkeep obligations on the landowner, and is freely transferable without the landowner's consent. The rights and obligations of the parties are primarily determined by the contents of the superficies agreement.

South Korean law
The equivalent right under South Korean law is called jisang-gwon (지상권). It can be found in Article 279 of the Civil Code of the Republic of Korea.

Thai law
The equivalent in Thailand is called Sithi Nuea Phuen-Din. Thailand adopted the French civil Law system. You will find a small section in the Thai Commercial and Civil Code under sections 1410 and 1416. It is spelled in Thai "สิทธิเหนือพื้นดิน".

German law
In German law the corresponding right is known as "Erbbaurecht" and governed by the ErbbauRG.

Notes 

Law of Japan
Roman law
Real property law